Giorgio Stirano (born 23 February 1950 in Turin) is an Italian racing car engineer, who worked for Forti and Osella in Formula One.

Early career
During his university years Stirano was a rally co-driver  and used to contribute to the motor sports pages of the daily newspaper Tuttosport. In January 1976, after graduating in aeronautical engineering in  1975 at the  Politecnico di Torino, he was hired by Osella Race Team as Sports Director and then went on to take on the role as Team Manager and Project Manager. At the time Osella raced in Formula 2, a category which they had entered into for the first time during the 1974 season after a period of minor successes in Italian sports car races and hillclimbing.

When the young Stirano started working at Osella, he was given the assignment of managing all the projects relating to the sport competitions, including Formula Super Ford, Formula 3, Formula 2 and sport. In the winter of 1978, Stirano designed an evolution of the old Osella FA2 for the 1979 season: this new car allowed Eddie Cheever to win races at Silverstone, the Pau Grand Prix and Zandvoort. Cheever’s victories and the car's good performances convinced Enzo Osella to invest in the team and to move up to Formula 1.

Formula 1
For the 1980 season, Stirano early support the design of the race car, the Osella FA1, managed by Nicola Materazzi, and when in October 1979 he left the team for Ferrari, Stirano became the chief engineer. Cheever was announced  driver of the Osella FA1 which had its debut at the Argentina GP. The Osella FA1, did not achieve good results, only a 12th place at the San Marino  GP and Imola collecting 9 drop outs and 4 failed qualifications.
To compensate for the start-up flaws, a second version of the car, the FA1B, was designed and built in collaboration with Giorgio Valentini.
Stirano, together with Valentini designed the  1981 car, the  FA1C,  which was entrusted this time to two private drivers,  Beppe Gabbiani and Miguel Ángel Guerra. The inexperience of the two drivers brought about very poor results that season. (Guerra failed to qualify at almost all the races and was involved in  a serious accident). 
Despite the change of designers and the withdrawal of Stirano around the middle of  1981, the team never achieved good results, to the point of disappearing altogether in 1990.

Designing
Meanwhile,  Stirano went on to dedicate his time to activities parallel to the world of motor racing :  together with three partners he founded  Alba Engineering and started building a car for  Formula 3, test driven by Enzo Coloni.
In 1982  Alba designed a car to race in the new C Group championship for the Carma of Martino Finotto and Carlo Facetti. The car, which was fitted with a turbo charged four-cylinder engine participated at the  FIA World Championship and won the FIA Cup for C Junior cars in  1983 and in  1984.
These  "custom" cars were also exported to the  United States where they participated at the  IMSA Championship with drivers such as  Gianpiero Moretti, Jim Trueman and others at the wheel.

Engineering
Stirano returned to the world of  Formula 1 in  1984, as the consultant of  Alfa Romeo, and in the years to follow he participated in the design and planning of the one-make training racing car  CSAI Alfa Boxer.
In 1986 he founded  PTI Alba Tech, an engineering company specializing in the planning and building of special competitive cars, and by doing so was able to expand the boundaries of the service provided to the mechanics of chassis and suspension of prototypes. 
Stirano, along with  Giugiaro and his Italdesign, collaborated in the designing of the  Machimoto, a concept-car which was presented at the  Salone dell'automobile di Torino. He also participated in the designing and planning of Giugiaro’s  Nazca,  Blitz (an electric racing car, designed by Bertone and ZER and  holder of the  speed  record for electric cars), and of  Pininfarina’s Ethos  (a 1992 prototype for an environmental friendly car).
In 1993 he collaborated with Alfa Corse to design the  Alfa 155 TS, which took part in the Italian Tourism Championship with the drivers Gabriele Tarquini, Gianni Morbidelli and Tamara Vidali, meanwhile  he was also involved with the Alfa Romeo team as Leading  Engineer. In 1994 Tarquini won the BTCC with the  Alfa 155 TS .

The return to  Formula 1
After the accident  that cost Ayrton Senna his life  during a race in  1994, Stirano was appointed by   Williams as expert surveyor on the side of the Williams team, which was being accused of causing the accident due to them having created an  undersized steering column. The enquiry, which started in  1997, had Stirano, Diego Milen, Roberto Vitali and  Giovanni Saccenti (the surveyors team for Williams) up against Tommaso Carletti and Mauro Forghieri. 
On officially returning to Formula 1 in  1995, Stirano, during his short adventure in this affluent championship,  was first appointed as Sports Director and then as  Team Manager of  Forti Corse : the team lined up drivers such as Pedro Paulo Diniz and Roberto Moreno. It was here that he developed the FG01 vehicle, originally designed by Sergio Rinland, which gained seventh place at the Australian GP driven by Diniz. This was Stirano’s last race in a Formula 1 pit box. That following winter together with the help of Chris Radage, Stirano designed the Forti FG 03, a much more modern and lighter vehicle. Unfortunately, they never got around to building it due to the economic crisis which led to Forti eventually going bankrupt in 1996.
In 1999 he worked together with  the members of Euroteam in the  STW championship with  Stefano Modena’s Alfa Romeo 156.
From  2002 to 2005 Stirano was the consultant of the race team Opel   Euroteam (OPC Opel DTM team), managing the races of the Opel Astra of Jeroen Bleekemolen and  Laurent Aiello. In the same period he was also providing technical assistance with  the creation of  Gloria, a company founded by Enrico Glorioso and specializing in the building of racing cars for Junior Championships. 
In 2006 Stirano founded the company, Albatech Monaco, an atelier of  design and engineering providing consultancy in the automotive and nautical fields
Stirano was for a long time a member of ACI CSAI, the Italian racing cars Federation, in the Technical Subcommittee and, as Italian Deputy Member, in the FIA Technical Commission, President of the  Motorsport Safety Council until 2006, and  Advisor SAE (Society of Automotive Engineers) for Italy from  1993 to  2000.
He is currently involved as commentator and news analyst for television programs regarding the world of  racing.
Since 2001 he has been co-author for the Formula 1 yearbook published by  Vallardi Editore. In 2003, together with Michael Ling, he edited the yearbook Formula 1 Championship 2003 Yearbook: The Complete Record of the Grand Prix Season.  In 2006 together with Paolo D'Alessio and Mirco Lazzari, he published Formula 1 - La cronaca e le foto più belle del campionato, editing the technical part of the book.  In  2007 Stirano and Paolo D’Alessio published the book "Red Passion" which speaks about the 60-year history of Ferrari races and in  2008 he and Paolo D’Alessio published the book “Gran Prix” which is about the ‘modern’ Formula 1.

References 

1950 births
Automotive engineers from Turin
Formula One designers
Living people
Alfa Romeo people
Italian motorsport people